Dan McCulloch is a British film and television producer and writer.

Career
He wrote the episode They Keep Killing Suzie for the science fiction series Torchwood in 2006. The episode title, a reference to the Avengers episode "They Keep Killing Steed", was originally announced as only "They Keep Killing" in order to conceal Suzie's death before the first broadcast of "Everything Changes". He co-wrote it with Paul Tomalin. He later worked as a producer on both films, such as The Stronger (2007) and Tony (2009), as well as television series like the Inspector Morse prequel Endeavour and Indian Summers. He serves as an executive producer on the adaptation of Philip Pullman's epic trilogy His Dark Materials for BBC One.

References

External links

British television producers
British film producers
British male screenwriters
British television writers
Living people
Year of birth missing (living people)